Abanca Ademar León is a Spanish handball team based in León, Spain. It plays in Liga ASOBAL.

History
Founded in 1956, Ademar León is the handball team of the city of León. Until 1975 it played in the provincial categories when not existing economic availability to be able to promotion. In that year the team promoted to 1ª División Nacional (being player of the team the currently chairman, Juan Arias). Its 6th place in 1995–96 allowed the club to play for the first time in its history a European competition (EHF City Cup). In 1996–97 Runner-up of Liga ASOBAL, and runner-up of ASOBAL Cup was able to proclaim itself, being third in the Copa del Rey and obtaining seat to play the EHF Champions League in the following season. In its home country, the club became champion a total of 1 time (2001) and won the Copa del Rey once (2002), the ASOBAL Cup twice (1999, 2009). The club won 2 international cups: EHF Cup Winner's Cup in 1999 and 2005.

Crest, colours, supporters

Kit manufacturers

Kits

Sports Hall information

Name: – Palacio de los Deportes de León
City: – León
Capacity: – 5188
Address: – Av. del Ing. Sáenz de Miera, s/n, 24009, León, Spain

Management

Team

Current squad 

Squad for the 2022–23 season

Technical staff
 Head coach:  Manolo Cadenas
 Assistant coach:  Luis Puertas Castrillo
 Physiotherapist:  Jorge Fernández Cabezón

Transfers

Transfers for the 2022–23 season

Joining 
  Juan Castro Álvarez (CB) from  Cavigal Nice HB
  David Fernández Alonso (RB) on loan from  Wisła Płock
  Tiago Filipe Mota de Sousa (P) from  Águas Santas

Leaving 
  Leandro Semedo (LB) to  S.L. Benfica
  Jaime Fernández Fernández (LW) to  HSG Nordhorn-Lingen
  Aidenas Malašinskas (CB) to  MT Melsungen
  Gonzalo Pérez Arce (RW) to  Wisła Płock
  Dragan Soljic (LP) to  BM Benidorm
  Nikolaos Liapis (LP) to  AEK Athens
  Milan Bomaštar (GK) to  IFK Skövde
  Álex Lodos (LB) on loan at  CB Nava

Previous Squads

Season by season

Trophies
Liga ASOBAL: 1
Winners: 2000–01.
Runners-up: 1996–97, 1998–99, 2016–17, 2017–18, 2019–20
Copa del Rey: 1
Winners: 2001–02.
Runners-up: 2009–10, 2020–21.
ASOBAL Cup: 2
Winners: 1998–99, 2008–09.
Runners-up: 1996–97, 1997–98, 2007–08, 2011–12, 2017–18, 2022–23.
Supercopa ASOBAL
Runners-up: 2001–02, 2002–03, 2021–22.
EHF Cup Winner's Cup: 2
Winners: 1998–99, 2004–05.
Runners-up: 2000–01, 2006–07.

European record

Cup Winners' Cup
From the 2012–13 season, the men's competition was merged with the EHF Cup.

EHF ranking

Former club members

Notable former players

  Julen Aguinagalde (2006-2009)
  Garcia Alberto Aguirrezabalaga (2005-2006)
  Mikel Aguirrezabalaga (2007–2011, 2014–2016)
  Juan Francisco Alemany (1995–1997)
  Vicente Álamo (2008–2009)
  Victor Alonso (2013–2014)
  Juan Andreu (2009–2012)
  Rafael Baena (2011–2012)
  Jon Belaustegui (2001–2003)
  Ignacio Biosca (2014–2019)
  Álvaro Cabanas (2008–2013)
  José Luis Pérez Canca (1996–2000)
  Manuel Colón (1995–2006)
  Alejandro Costoya (2016–2018)
  Alberto Entrerríos (1998–2001)
  Raúl Entrerríos (2001–2007)
  David Fernández Alonso (2016–2020, 2022–)
  Jaime Fernández Fernández (2014–2022)
  Álvaro Ferrer (2011–2012)
  Aleix Franch (1995–1996)
  Rubén Garabaya (1997–1999)
  Juanín García (1997–2005, 2015–2019)
  Mateo Garralda (2006–2008)
  Iosu Goñi Leoz (2009–2013)
  Fernando Hernández (1996–2000)
  José Javier Hombrados (1996–2000)
  Yeray Lamariano (2001–2007, 2015)
  Demetrio Lozano (1995–1998)
  Iñaki Malumbres (2012–2013)
  Rubén Marchán (2019-2021)
  Ángel Montoro (2008–2012)
  Viran Morros (2004–2007)
  Iñaki Ordoñez (2000–2001)
  Javier Ortigosa (2008–2012)
  Juan José Panadero (1997–1999)
  Roberto García Parrondo (2003–2006)
  David Pisonero (1997–1998)
  Xavier Pascual Fuertes (1994–1995)
  Gonzalo Pérez Arce (2017–2022)
  Juan Pérez (1993-1994, 1998-2002)
  Antonio García Robledo (2011–2012)
  Iker Romero (2000–2001)
  Carlos Ruesga (2010–2013)
  Daniel Sarmiento (2007–2009)
  Santi Urdiales (2006–2008)
  Belgacem Filah (2004)
  Khalifa Ghedbane (2020–2021)
  Gonzalo Carou (2008-2014, 2015-2020)
  Eric Gull (2000–2001)
  Pedro Martínez Cami (2019–2021)
  Sebastián Simonet (2016-2019)
  Federico Matías Vieyra (2013–2020)
  Roland Schlinger (2006–2007)
  Nikola Prce (2009–2010)
  Danijel Šarić (2006–2008)
  Vladimir Vranješ (2012–2013)
  Faruk Vražalić (2012–2013)
  Dzmitry Patotski (2018–2020)
  Felipe Borges (2011–2013)
  Leonardo Domenech de Almeida (2013–2015)
  Raul Nantes (2009–2012)
  João Pedro Silva (2014–2015)
  Leonardo Santos (2015–2017)
  Erwin Feuchtmann (2019–2021)
  Leandro Semedo (2020-2022)
  Mirko Alilović (2005-2010)
  Matej Ašanin (2012-2014)
  Damir Bičanić (2008-2010)
  Denis Buntić (2008-2011)
  Igor Kos (2008-2009)
  Venio Losert (2010–2012)
  Tin Lučin (2019–2021)
  Petar Metličić (2002-2005)
  Mirza Šarić (1999-2000)
  Dino Slavić (2018-2021)
  Tonči Valčić (2007-2008)
  Kasper Hvidt (2000-2004)
  Claus Møller Jakobsen (2006-2008)
  Adrien Dipanda (2011–2012)
  Csaba Bartók (2000–2002)
  Imre Bíró (1993–1995)
  Ivo Díaz (2005–2006)
  Balázs Laluska (2005–2008)
  Patrik Ligetvári (2018–2019)
  Saeid Barkhordari (2022–)
  Sigfús Sigurðsson (2006–2008)
  Kim Jin-Young (2021–)
  Aidenas Malašinskas (2022)
  Zanas Virbauskas (2021–)
  Darko Dimitrievski (2014–2015)
  Radivoje Ristanović (2009)
  Ole Erevik (2004–2005)
  Kristian Kjelling (2002–2006)
  Thomas Kristensen (2014–2015)
  Stian Vatne (2002–2005)
  Mateusz Piechowski (2020–2021)
  Ricardo Costa (2006–2011)
  Denis Krivochlykov (2000–2012)
  Alexander Tatarintsev (2012–2014)
  Mladen Bojinović (1999–2000)
  Milan Bomaštar (2021–2022)
  Vladimir Cupara (2015–2018)
  Marko Ćuruvija (2003–2006)
  Dalibor Čutura (2010–2012)
  Slobodan Kuzmanovski (1996–1997)
  Đorđe Golubović (2012–2013)
  Marko Milosavljević (2021–)
  Ivan Mošić (2018–2020)
  Živan Pešić (2017–2019)
  Dragan Škrbić (1995–1997)
  Predrag Vejin (2013–2015, 2017–2018)
  Uroš Zorman (2003–2004)
  Carlos Lima (2000–2001)
  Stanislav Demovič (1998-2001)
  Martin Straňovský (2005–2012)
  Magnus Andersson (2001)
  Dalibor Doder (2009–2010)
  Staffan Olsson (2004)
  Andrew Donlin (2019–2021)

Former coaches

References

External links
 
 

Spanish handball clubs
Liga ASOBAL teams
Handball clubs established in 1956
Sport in León, Spain
Sports teams in Castile and León
1956 establishments in Spain